AFO may refer to:
 Academia Film Olomouc, a Czech film festival
 Advanced Force Operations, a US military term
 Aero Force One, a fan club for the rock band Aerosmith
 Afghan Film Organization, a film production company and archive.
 Afo Dodoo (born 1973), Ghanaian footballer
 AFO Records, the first African-American owned record label in the US
 Air Force One (disambiguation)
 Alien Front Online, a video game
 Animal Face-Off, a television show
 Animal feeding operation, as defined by the Environmental Protection Agency
 Anime Festival Orlando, a yearly anime convention in Orlando, Florida
 Ankle-foot orthosis, a brace for the ankle and foot
 Anti-Fascist Organisation, a provisional organization in Burma during World War II
 Arellano-Felix Organization, a drug trafficking cartel in Mexico, also known as the Tijuana Cartel
 Assemblée de la francophonie de l'Ontario, a Canadian cultural organization
 Association of Field Ornithologists, an ornithological organization, publishers of Journal of Field Ornithology
 Australian Field Ornithology, a journal of BirdLife Australia
 Authorised Firearms Officer, a police officer in the UK who has received training and authorization to carry and use firearms
 Eloyi language (ISO-639: afo)
 Eloyi people, also called Afo
 Afo, thought to be the world's oldest Clove Tree